Roopkathar Radio is a 2021 Indian Bengali language crime and thriller web series directed by Sayan Dasgupta and written by Arnab Bhaumik.

The web series starring Biswanath Basu, Pinky Banerjee, Sujata Daw, Samir Biswas, Baby Sarkar, Tarun Chakraborty, and Shahana Sen are in lead roles.

Synopsis 
A musical love extravaganza called Roopkathar Radio narrates the tale of the Chowdhury family from North Kolkata. The Chowdhury family resides in an old mansion where they harbour their hopes and sorrows. Just around the bend comes Durga Puja. Bhabotosh, a local promoter and muscle guy, wants to take the Chowdhurys' house so he can use the land for a high-rise building.

Couple Rudra and Shibani show up as tenants in Chowdhury Mansion on the day of Mahalaya. Equations begin to change immediately as emotions do. Finally, with the aid of Rudra and Shibani, the family members are able to overcome Bhabotosh. Chowdhury's granddaughter Oli discovers her true love. Roopkothar Radio is a collection of feelings depicted on the most beautiful experience we will ever have: ordinary life.

Cast 
Biswanath Basu as Bhabotosh
Pinky Banerjee as Mala Chowdhury
Sujata Daw as Shibani
Samir Biswas as Harimadhab Chowdhury
Lama Halder as Rudra
Baby Sarkar as Kanakbala Chowdhury 
Tarun Chakraborty as Kamal Madhab Chowdhury
Shahana Sen as Hasi
Adrija Dutta as Raka

Episodes

Soundtrack
The music of the series is composed by Biswajit Das and DCHAKS is the lyricist. The singers are Biswajit Das, Saptak Das and Suvodeep Mukherjee.

References

External links 
 

2021 films
Indian thriller films
Bengali-language web series